The Walter Scott Prize for historical fiction is a British literary award founded in 2010. At £25,000, it is one of the largest literary awards in the UK. The award was created by the Duke and Duchess of Buccleuch, whose ancestors were closely linked to Scottish author Sir Walter Scott, who is generally considered the originator of historical fiction with the novel Waverley in 1814.

Eligible books must have been first published in the UK, Ireland or Commonwealth in the preceding year. For the purpose of the award, historical fiction is defined as being that where the main events take place more than 60 years ago, i.e. outside of any mature personal experience of the author. The winner is announced each June at the Borders Book Festival in Melrose.

Recipients

Notes

References

External links
Walter Scott Prize
"Walter Scott Prize for historical fiction: The new time-travellers", Scotsman.com, 19 June 2010 – examines a rising interest in historical fiction in relation to the new prize.

 
Awards established in 2010
2010 establishments in the United Kingdom
British literary awards
Historical fiction awards